Daniel McMenamin (1 March 1882 – 13 February 1964) was an Irish politician. A barrister by profession, McMenamin first stood for election at the 1918 general election as an Irish Parliamentary Party candidate for the Donegal West constituency but was defeated by Sinn Féin's Joseph Sweeney. He stood as an independent candidate at the 1923 general election but was not elected. He was first elected to Dáil Éireann as a National League Party Teachta Dála (TD) for the Donegal constituency at the June 1927 general election. He did not contest the September 1927 general election.

He was elected as a Cumann na nGaedheal TD at the 1932 and 1933 general elections. At the 1937 general election he was re-elected as a Fine Gael TD for Donegal East. He was re-elected at each general election until he retired at the 1961 general election. He served as Leas-Cheann Comhairle (deputy chairperson) during the 12th Dáil from 1944 to 1948.

McMenamin died on 13 February 1964 in Sandymount, Dublin.

His daughter Rosaleen Linehan is a stage and screen actress in Ireland.

As of the 2020 Irish general election, he was the last TD to have been elected to the Dáil from the Finn Valley.

References

1882 births
1964 deaths
Independent politicians in Ireland
National League Party TDs
Cumann na nGaedheal TDs
Fine Gael TDs
Members of the 5th Dáil
Members of the 7th Dáil
Members of the 8th Dáil
Members of the 9th Dáil
Members of the 10th Dáil
Members of the 11th Dáil
Members of the 12th Dáil
Members of the 13th Dáil
Members of the 14th Dáil
Members of the 15th Dáil
Members of the 16th Dáil
Politicians from County Donegal
Irish barristers
Irish Nationalist politicians